Kong Lingxuan is a Chinese table tennis player. He previously represented China at the 2013 World Junior Table Tennis Championships in Rabat, Morocco.

References

Living people
Chinese male table tennis players
People from Jining
Table tennis players from Shandong
Universiade medalists in table tennis
Year of birth missing (living people)
Universiade gold medalists for China
Medalists at the 2017 Summer Universiade
Medalists at the 2019 Summer Universiade